Muhyiddin School is a mixed-sex public educational institution located in Vilimalé, Maldives. Established in 1999, the school is English medium with the exception of Dhivehi and Islam. The school introduced Secondary Education in 2006 and now facilitates education opportunities for both Primary and Secondary students. In 2010, it was decided that Secondary students would attend the school in the morning while Primary grades are to attend on the afternoon.

History
Muhiyiddin School is named after the king, Al Sultan Mohamed Muhyiddeenul A'dil Siri Naakiree Sundhara Mahaaradhun, who ruled the country from 1691 to 1692. He was an eminent scholar and a prominent intellectual who contributed a great deal to improve the education and religious awareness in the country. Scholars were exceedingly respected and recognized buy His Majesty as a high concern.
The school was initially opened on 8 March 1994 with two teachers and fifteen students. At the outset, two bungalows, which were built for the purpose of tourism, were used as school premises. Multi grade teaching was carried out in these classes.
As the school enrolment increased rapidly, government decides to construct new buildings and upgrade the school. The former Minister of education Doctor Mohamed Latheef laid the foundation of the first phase of the school on 16 June 1996. Under the project, five temporary classrooms were built in 1998 and another four-storey building was constructed in 2000 to meet the inadequacy of classroom and other facilities.
The former President of Maldives His Excellency Maumoonu Abdul Qayyoom, officially inaugurated Muhiyyiddin School on 7 June 1999.

Sport and tradition
The school is divided into four houses: Mayya (blue), Farumaanu (red), Hungaanu (yellow), and Dhanmaanu (green). Student clubs and associations include art club, BASE club (Business Association for Student Entrepreneur), Dhivehi club (Tharaha), English club (Zenith), environment club, and science club.

The school's football team was the U-16 champion in the 2010 16th Milo Inter-school Football Tournament. The game's goal keeper, top scorer, and one of the best five players in the tournament were all from Muhyiddin School.

References

Schools in the Maldives
Malé
Educational institutions established in 1999
1999 establishments in the Maldives